Abolfazl Ghadyani (Persian: ابوالفضل قدیانی; born 1945) is a senior member of the Mojahedin of the Islamic Revolution of Iran Organization. 

He was jailed and tortured during the regime of Mohammad Reza Shah, and he is jailed now under the Islamic Republic of Iran. Ghadyani is in jail because he has publicly challenged the veracity of the presidential election of 2009. On January 14, 2013 Ghadyani was transferred to the  Ghezel Hesar prison from Evin prison in Tehran. He has been a harsh critic of Supreme Leader Ali Khamenei and, as part of his jail sentence, was ordered to hand-copy three books in favor of Khamenei and the Islamic Republic.

Hamid Dabashi, professor of Iranian Studies at Columbia University, praised Ghadyani in a 2012 opinion piece published in Al-Jazeera, describing him as an anti-authoritarian "Muslim Revolutionary."

References

Iranian activists
Living people
1945 births
Mojahedin of the Islamic Revolution of Iran Organization politicians
Iranian politicians convicted of crimes